Cockram Mill is a historic grist mill complex located near Meadows of Dan, Patrick County, Virginia. The mill dates to about 1885, and is a two- and three-story, rectangular frame building on a concrete foundation. It measures 111 feet by 24 feet and is located adjacent to a concrete dam on the headwaters of the Dan River.  The mill is operated by two metal turbine wheels, 14 feet and 16 feet in diameter.  Associated with the mill is the contributing miller's house built about 1921.

It was listed on the National Register of Historic Places in 1990.

References

External links
Patrick County Chamber of Commerce

Grinding mills on the National Register of Historic Places in Virginia
Industrial buildings completed in 1885
Buildings and structures in Patrick County, Virginia
National Register of Historic Places in Patrick County, Virginia
Grinding mills in Virginia